is a Japanese futsal player for the Japan national team.

Clubs 
 1996-2005 Tahara FC
 2005-2009 Bardral Urayasu
 2009-2014 Nagoya Oceans
 2014-2015 Agleymina Hamamatsu

Titles 
 F.League (5)
 2009–10, 2010–11, 2011–12, 2012–13, 2013–14
 All Japan Futsal Championship (2)
 2013, 2014
 F.League Ocean Cup (5)
 2010, 2011, 2012, 2013, 2014
 AFC Futsal Club Championship (2)
 2011, 2014

References

External links
FIFA profile

1978 births
Living people
Futsal goalkeepers
Japanese men's futsal players
Bardral Urayasu players
Nagoya Oceans players
People from Shizuoka Prefecture